Pizzo Formico is a mountain located within the Bergamasque Prealps in Lombardy, Italy.

References 

Mountains of the Alps
Mountains of Lombardy